Johan Adolf Reinhold Jahr , born Johansson (23 June 1893 – 19 April 1964) was a Swedish film actor. He appeared in more than 60 films between 1925 and 1962.

Selected filmography

 Mother-in-Law's Coming (1932)
 False Greta (1934)
 A Wedding Night at Stjarnehov (1934)
 Kanske en gentleman (1935)
 The Ghost of Bragehus (1936)
 Conscientious Objector Adolf (1936)
 Poor Millionaires (1936)
 Adolf Strongarm (1937)
 Just a Bugler (1938)
 A Cruise in the Albertina (1938)
 Adolf Saves the Day (1938)
 Between Us Barons (1939)
 Swing it, magistern! (1940)
 A Real Man (1940)
 Dunungen (1941)
 Guttersnipes (1944)
 The People of Hemsö (1944)
 The Österman Brothers' Virago (1945)
 The Wedding on Solö (1946)
 Evening at the Djurgarden (1946)
 The Poetry of Ådalen (1947)
 Främmande hamn (1948)
 Carnival Evening (1948)
 Robinson in Roslagen (1948)
 Lars Hård (1948)
 The Quartet That Split Up (1950)
 While the City Sleeps (1950)
 Skipper in Stormy Weather (1951)
 Dance, My Doll (1953)
 Storm Over Tjurö (1954)
 Our Father and the Gypsy (1954)
 People of the Finnish Forests (1955)
 Laughing in the Sunshine (1956)
 Only a Waiter (1959)
 When Darkness Falls (1960)

References

External links

1893 births
1964 deaths
People from Krokom Municipality
Swedish male film actors
Swedish male silent film actors
20th-century Swedish male actors